The 2008 United States Senate election in South Carolina was held on November 4, 2008 to elect a member of the United States Senate to represent the State of South Carolina. Incumbent Republican U.S. Senator Lindsey Graham won election to a second term.

Democratic primary

Candidates 
 Bob Conley, pilot
 Michael Cone, attorney

Campaign 
Conley, a conservative Democrat, supported ending illegal immigration, "protecting American workers," bringing American troops home from the Iraq War, increasing veterans' benefits, reducing American dependence on foreign oil, tougher regulations on Wall Street (bringing back Glass-Steagall), ending Wall Street bailouts, repealing the Patriot Act, "cutting spending," and "fidelity to the Constitution." He also opposed same-sex marriage.

Michael Cone, Conley's primary opponent, criticized Conley for being too conservative, that "We've nominated a Republican in a Democratic primary." Conley was a Republican but left the party due to frustration over immigration, trade, and the Iraq War. Some compared him to Republican Congressman Ron Paul, as Conley supported Paul in his presidential campaign.

Results 
Conley defeated Cone in the primary election on June 16, following a recount, by a margin of 1,058 votes.

Republican primary

Candidates 
 Lindsey Graham, incumbent U.S. Senator
 Buddy Witherspoon, former National Committeeman of the South Carolina Republican Party

Polling

Results

General election

Candidates 
 Bob Conley (D), pilot
 Lindsey Graham (R), incumbent U.S. Senator

Campaign 
Conley, who had switched to the Democratic Party from the Republican Party, was opposed by much of the Democratic establishment because of his controversial positions such as his vocal opposition to immigration reform and same-sex marriage and his support of Ron Paul's presidential bid. A number of prominent Democratic figures in the state, including U.S. Congressman James Clyburn, supported Lindsey Graham over Conley in the general election. Political scientist Bill Moore claimed "The bottom line is, by not paying attention to this race, they ended up embarrassed by what has transpired: a Republican getting the Democratic Party's nomination for U.S. Senate and a Republican who comes across as even more conservative than Lindsey Graham."

Graham had $3.8 million. In fact, he spent more time on the campaign trail for John McCain than he has defending his own seat. Conley only raised $23,628 during the campaign. Conley was so unknown that even Graham admitted "Almost no one knows my opponent. The Democrats really didn't field a — make a serious challenge — in terms of trying to find an opponent for me."

Despite Conley’s landslide defeat, he is the last Democrat to carry McCormick County in a Senate election as of 2023.

Predictions

Polling

Results

See also 
 2008 United States Senate elections
 2008 United States House of Representatives elections in South Carolina

References

External links 
 South Carolina State Election Commission
 U.S. Congress candidates for South Carolina at Project Vote Smart
 South Carolina, U.S. Senate from CQ Politics
 South Carolina U.S. Senate from OurCampaigns.com
 Campaign contributions from OpenSecrets
 Graham (R-i) vs Conley (D) graph of multiple polls from Pollster.com
 Official campaign websites (Archived)
 Lindsey Graham
 Bob Conley
 John J. Cina

2008
South Carolina
United States Senate